The Circle Album Chart, known as the Gaon Album Chart until its July 2022 rebranding, is a South Korean record chart that ranks the best-selling albums and EPs in South Korea. It is part of the Circle Chart, which launched in February 2010. The data is compiled by the Ministry of Culture, Sports and Tourism and the Korea Music Content Industry Association based upon weekly/monthly physical album sales by six major South Korean distributors: Kakao Entertainment, SM Entertainment, Sony Music Korea, Warner Music Korea, Universal Music and Stone Music Entertainment.

Following the announcement of the data for week 27 and the monthly chart of June, the Gaon Album Chart was rebranded to the Circle Album Chart in line with Gaon's rebranding to Circle. It was also announced that album sales would be published on the chart each week.

Weekly charts

Monthly charts

References

External links
 Current Circle Album Chart 

2022
Korea, South albums
2022 in South Korean music